Sokolovo (Russian title Соколово) is a 1974 Soviet–Czechoslovak war film made by Otakar Vávra depicting the Battle of Sokolovo in 1943. The film was published in two parts and was meant as the middle part of Vávra's "war trilogy" consisting of movies Days of Betrayal, Sokolovo and Liberation of Prague.

Plot
The plot begins in the Soviet Union showing first efforts to establish the Czechoslovak legion in 1942. The film also shows the assassination of Heydrich and the subsequent annihilation of Lidice. The main topis of the film is battles with German troops for Sokolovo.

Cast
Ladislav Chudík as Ludvík Svoboda
Vladimír Samojlov as generálporučík
Jurij Solomin as general Shafarenko
Bohumil Pastorek as Klement Gottwald
Martin Štěpánek as npor. Otakar Jaroš
Lev Ivanov as náměstek lidového komisaře
Jiří Pleskot as Eduard Beneš
Hanjo Hasse as Reinhard Heydrich
Vladimír Ráž as Sergěj Ingr
Josef Langmiler as Zdeněk Fierlinger
Ladislav Hádl as Kopecký
Ivan Ryzhov as pplk. Bilyutin
Štefan Kvietik as Špígl
Pavel Pípal as Opatrný
Jiří Krampol as Karel Horák
Jan Kanyza as Rataj
Rudolf Jelínek as ppor.Antonín Sochor
Ladislav Lakomý as Rediš
Emil Horváth as Daniš
Renáta Doleželová as Anka Kadlecová
Jurij Nazarov as npor. Filatov
Vladimír Protasenko as por. Šironin

References

External links
 
 Sokolovo (1974) on Czecho-Slovak Movie Database (Czech)

1974 films
1970s Czech-language films
Czech resistance to Nazi occupation in film
Czech war films
World War II films based on actual events
Films about Operation Anthropoid
Soviet war films
Films directed by Otakar Vávra
Czechoslovak multilingual films
Soviet multilingual films
1970s Russian-language films
1974 multilingual films
Czech World War II films
Soviet World War II films
Czechoslovak World War II films
Russian World War II films
1970s Czech films
Czech films based on actual events
Czech epic films
Czech propaganda films
Soviet epic films